Orchestra of Bubbles is a collaborative studio album by Ellen Allien and Apparat. It was released through BPitch Control on 17 April 2006.

Critical reception

Thom Jurek of AllMusic gave the album 4 stars out of 5, saying, "For anyone sincerely interested in the open territory of electronic music and its possible futures, this is not only a microscope to examine the new bacteria with, it's the pulsing life form beneath it." Philip Sherburne of Pitchfork gave the album an 8.5 out of 10, calling it "an impressive record" and "a remarkable feat of engineering."

Resident Advisor named it the 48th best album of the 2000s.

Track listing

Personnel
Credits adapted from liner notes.

 Ellen Allien – production, recording
 Sascha Ring – production, recording
 Luca Baldini – rave signal (1)
 Katrin Pfänder – strings (3, 7)
 Lisa Stepf – strings (3, 7)

Charts

References

External links
 

2006 albums
Collaborative albums
Apparat (musician) albums
Ellen Allien albums
BPitch Control albums